The Snow Maiden is a 1968 Soviet fantasy film directed by Pavel Kadochnikov.

Plot 
The Snow Maiden is the daughter of Ded Moroz and the Beauty of Spring. Her icy heart has never known simple human joys, never known love before meeting Lel. His spiritual warmth gave the girl the wealth of the surrounding world, melted the heart of the cold beauty.

Cast 
 Yevgenia Filonova as Snegurochka
 Evgeny Zharikov as Lel
 Irina Gubanova as Kupava
 Boris Khimichev as Misghir
 Pavel Kadochnikov as Tsar Berendey
 Natalya Klimova as Vesna
 Valeri Malyshev as Brusilo
 Sergey Filippov as Bermyata
 Boris Shcherbakov as young man
 Andrey Apsolon as Bakula

References

External links 
 

1968 films
1960s Russian-language films
Soviet fantasy films
Films based on children's books
Soviet films based on plays
Lenfilm films
Films set around New Year
Snegurochka
1960s fantasy films